Eduardo Figueiredo Cavalheiro Leite (born 10 March 1985) is a Brazilian politician and governor of the state of Rio Grande do Sul. During the state's 2018 election, he won with 53.62% of the vote. Leite was elected governor at 33 years old, becoming the youngest governor in Brazil. In July 2021, Leite came out as gay during an interview for the Brazilian talk show Conversa com Bial, becoming the first openly gay governor in Brazil's history. He was again elected to the governorship of Rio Grande do Sul in the second round of the 2022 gubernatorial election.

Political career

Leite began his career in politics at a young age, first running for Pelotas city council in 2004 at age 19. Though unsuccessful, Leite began working for local Brazilian Social Democracy Party (PSDB) municipal politicians and, in 2009, would be elected to Pelotas city council. In 2011, Leite became the Pelotas City Council President. In 2013, Leite won the city's mayoral election and served from 2013 to 2016.

During his term as mayor, Leite modernized management methods and prioritized fiscal austerity, which resulted in balanced public accounts. He was able to guarantee funding for major infrastructure works and the remodeling of the urban mobility system, while also improving local health and education indicators. Leite ended his term with an approval rating of 87%.. Concerned with high incumbency rates among Brazilian politicians, Leite opted to not run for re-election, instead backing his vice-mayor, Paula Schild Mascarenhas, in her successful candidacy.

In 2016, Eduardo Leite was chosen by “Americas Quarterly”, a North-American magazine, as one of the five most promising politicians under 40 in Latin America.

After his term as mayor, Leite enrolled in a Master's program in Public Management at Fundação Getúlio Vargas.

Governor of Rio Grande do Sul

2018 gubernatorial campaign 
In 2017, the PSDB, under Leite's leadership, withdrew support from the administration of José Ivo Sartori. The following year, the PSDB nominated Leite as its gubernatorial candidate. Sartori originally expressed an interest in Leite standing as his running mate. In the first round of elections, Leite earned 35.9% of the vote and faced Sartori in a runoff election. Leite won the runoff election with nearly 54% of the vote.

During the same Legislative elections, Leite's electoral coalition only elected 18 of the 55 members of the State Legislature, requiring Leite to enter into coalition negotiations to obtain a parliamentary majority. Leite was able to secure the support of many formerly Sartori-aligned parties, including the Brazilian Socialist Party, Democrats and the Liberal Party. While initially reluctant, the Brazilian Democratic Movement voted to join Leite's government upon the recognition of similarities between their economic policies. After the successful negotiations, 32 of 55 Assembly members backed the Leite administration.

First term 

Leite was sworn as the governor of Rio Grande do Sul in 2019. In his inauguration address, he stressed the necessity of political conciliation to overcome the economic crisis in increasingly polarized times. He allocated most of his cabinet membership to coalition partners, having nine parties represented. Alleging cost reduction, he became the first governor to live in the state's palace since Olívio Dutra.

He established privatizations as a priority, with the state-owned companies of energy, mines and natural gas being its main targets. Since the State Constitution requires referendums to privatize these stated owned companies, Leite introduced a constitutional amendment to abolish this requirement, it was approved by Assembly in May 2019, by 40 ayes vs 13 no, with all but the PT, PDT and PSOL voting in favor. In August 2019, the State Assembly authorized the sale of these state companies, with the process being fully completed in early 2021.

In late 2019, he announced a comprehensive austerity package that would include pension reform and changes to the state public service, Leite described the changes as necessary to restore fiscal responsibility but allied parties were skeptical of the proposal, with the Social Liberal Party initially withdrawing support from the government. After lengthy negotiations with each of the coalition parties and the syndicates, the Assembly approved the reform in January 2020, it was considered a historical victory and the most ambitious reform in the state's history.

In 2021, far-right politician Roberto Jefferson used a homophobic slur against Leite while critiquing the response of his government to the COVID-19 pandemic. On 19 March 2021, Leite filed a criminal complaint against Jefferson. In September 2022, Jeffereson's conviction was definitively confirmed by Rio Grande do Sul State Court of Justice. Jefferson was ordered to pay a fine of R$ 300,000 (USD 55,427).

2022 gubernatorial campaign 
On 31 March 2022, he resigned as Governor of Rio Grande do Sul to possibly run in the 2022 presidential election, despite his defeat in the 2021 PSDB presidential primary.
 He eventually announced he would seek reelection as Governor of Rio Grande do Sul. In the first round, the former governor received 26.81% of votes, coming in 2nd place with only 2,441 votes more than Edegar Pretto from the Workers' Party who came in third place with 26.77%. He faced Onyx Lorenzoni in the second round, prevailing over him with 57.12% of votes.

Second term 
Leite was sworn in on 1 January 2023 as governor of Rio Grande do Sul for a second term.

Political positions

Leite is considered a left-leaning member of the PSDB. Leite identified as a social democrat in 2019, and as a social liberal in 2020, arguing that the state has a role to play in regulating business and helping to manage inequality, while also stating that the private sector and social entrepreneurship has a role to play. Prior to this, he has expressed support for same-sex marriage and decriminalization of marijuana, although he took a more conservative stance on the decriminalization of abortion. Leite has also expressed support for urban gun control measures.

References

|-

|-

|-

1985 births
Living people
Brazilian Social Democracy Party politicians
Brazilian people of Portuguese descent
Brazilian people of Italian descent
Governors of Rio Grande do Sul
People from Pelotas
Federal University of Pelotas alumni
LGBT mayors
Brazilian LGBT politicians
Gay politicians